George Hagan may refer to:

 George Elliott Hagan (1916–1990), American politician, businessman and farmer
 George Hagan (politician) (born 1938), Ghanaian politician